Binibining Pilipinas 2012 was the 49th edition of the Binibining Pilipinas pageant. It was held on April 15, 2012 at the Smart Araneta Coliseum in Quezon City, Metro Manila, Philippines.

At the end of the event, Shamcey Supsup crowned Janine Mari Tugonon as Miss Universe Philippines 2012, Dianne Elaine Necio crowned Nicole Cassandra Schmitz as Binibining Pilipinas International 2012, and Isabella Angela Manjon crowned Katrina Jayne Dimaranan as Binibining Pilipinas Tourism 2012. Elaine Kay Moll was named 1st Runner-Up, and Annalie Forbes was named 2nd Runner-Up.

Later that year, Elaine Kay Moll was appointed as Binibining Pilipinas Supranational 2012. On the following year, Annalie Forbes was appointed as Binibining Pilipinas Grand International 2013.

Results
Color keys
  The contestant was a Runner-up in an International pageant.
  The contestant was a Semi-Finalist in an International pageant.
  The contestant did not compete in an International pageant.

Special Awards

Judges 
 H.E. Jorge Domecq – Ambassador of Spain to the Philippines
 Ashley Ferguson – Director of Commercial Marketing for Avon Southeast Asia
 Richard Gomez – Movie and TV Personality, Athlete
 Olivier Gougeon – CEO of Société Générale Private Banking South Asia
 Risa Hontiveros-Baraquel – Former Akbayan Partylist Representative
 John Martin Miller – Chairman and CEO of Nestlé Philippines
 Cesar Purisima – Secretary of the Department of Finance
 Precious Lara Quigaman – Miss International 2005, Movie and TV Personality, Freelance Writer
 Jose Manuel Romualdez – Publisher and CEO of People Asia Magazine
 H.E. Harry K. Thomas, Jr. – Ambassador of the United States to the Philippines
 Casimiro Ynares, III – Governor of Rizal
 Phil Younghusband – Forward for the Philippine national football team

Contestants
30 contestants competed for the three titles.

Notes

Post-pageant Notes 

 Janine Tugonon competed at Miss Universe 2012 in Las Vegas, Nevada and was named First Runner-Up. On the other hand, Nicole Schmitz competed at Miss International 2012 in Okinawa and was one of the fifteen semifinalists.
 Katrina Dimaranan did not compete internationally in 2012 due to the Miss Tourism Queen International 2012 pageant, which supposedly was set in China, was cancelled due to undisclosed reasons. In 2018, Dimaranan was appointed as Miss Supranational USA 2018 and represented the United States at Miss Supranational 2018. She finished as 1st Runner-Up and won the Best Body Figure Award. Dimaranan then competed at Miss Universe Philippines 2021 representing Taguig wherein she finished as Miss Universe Philippines Tourism 2021.
 Elaine Kay Moll was appointed as Binibining Pilipinas Supranational 2012 and competed at Miss Supranational 2012. Moll finished as 3rd Runner-Up. On the other hand, Annalie Forbes was appointed as Binibining Pilipinas Grand International 2013 and competed at Miss Grand International 2013 where she finished as 3rd Runner-Up.
 Angelee delos Reyes competed again at Miss Philippines Earth where she was crowned as Miss Philippines Earth 2013. She competed at Miss Earth 2013 in Muntinlupa where she finished as one of the eight finalists. Delos Reyes also won the Miss Eco Tourism and the Miss Fitflop awards.
 Mary Jean Lastimosa competed for the third time at Binibining Pilipinas 2014 and was crowned Binibining Pilipinas Universe 2014. She competed at Miss Universe 2014 in Doral where she finished as a Top 10 finalist.
 Karen Gallman competed again at Binibining Pilipinas 2018 and was crowned Binibining Pilipinas Intercontinental 2018. She competed at Miss Intercontinental 2018 and won.

References

2012
2012 in the Philippines
2012 beauty pageants